The Kel-Tec P-11 is a compact, semi-automatic, short-recoil operated pistol chambered in 9 mm Luger. It was manufactured by Kel-Tec CNC Industries of Cocoa, FL from 1995 to 2019.

Design and specifications
The P-11 was designed by Swedish-born George Kellgren, the designer of many earlier Husqvarna (Sweden), Intratec, and Grendel brand firearms. The P-11 used an aluminum receiver inside a polymer grip housing held on with polymer pins. The slide, barrel, and magazine were steel. The standard magazine held 10 rounds. At  unloaded, the handgun itself was comparatively light. The P-11 lacked an external manual safety, relying instead on a long and heavy double action only trigger pull, which requires 9 pounds of pressure, to prevent accidental discharge. A firing pin spring and low-mass hammer prevented discharge if the gun was dropped. The P-11 would also accept some Smith & Wesson 59 series magazines. An adapter was available that would wrap around the base of 15-round Smith & Wesson model 59-style magazines. Smith & Wesson series 69 compact 12-round magazines would also work, with a matching short adapter sleeve, as well.  Accessories such as trigger shoes, finger-rests, belt clips, steel guide rods to replace the factory installed polymer guide rod, gray- and OD green-colored polymer grip housings, night sights, and other accessories are also available from the manufacturer.

Variants

For a short period, the P-11 was offered in .40 S&W and .357 SIG with reduced magazine capacity. These weapons were designated P-40 and P-357. These models mated a P-11's frame to a larger slide width and barrel. Kel-Tec has suspended production of these pistols and conversion kits. In 2006, Kel-Tec introduced a single-stack pistol based on the P-11 with engineering improvements borrowed from the P-3AT.  The resulting PF-9 pistol weighs about the same loaded as the P-11 empty and is somewhat slimmer.

Marketing
The P-11 was designed for concealed carry by members of the general public and law enforcement officers. It was only slightly wider than the staggered-column magazine it used. It was marketed to users who wanted a concealable firearm with a "full-power" defensive cartridge. The barrel was near the minimum length possible with a Browning tilting-barrel system of operation.  The gun easily fit into a pocket, small holster, or inside a handbag. All edges were rounded and smoothed allowing comfort while carrying concealed. Few protrusions on the pistol could catch on a pocket holster, a deep concealment, or inside of waistband holster.

See also
 Sccy CPX-1
 Taurus PT111

References

Review: http://www.humanevents.com/2011/08/23/review-of-the-keltec-p11-a-pocketful-of-9mm/

External links
Kel-Tec CNC Industries P-11 Handgun
Kel-Tec Owners Group  (KTOG)

Semi-automatic pistols of the United States
9mm Parabellum semi-automatic pistols
.380 ACP semi-automatic pistols